The types of sovereign state leaders in the Philippines have varied throughout the country's history, from heads of ancient chiefdoms, kingdoms and sultanates in the pre-colonial period, to the leaders of Spanish, American, and Japanese colonial governments, until the directly elected president of the modern sovereign state of the Philippines.

Archaic (pre-hispanic) Era
Before the nation of the Philippines was formed, the area of what was now the Philippines during the pre-colonial times was sets of divided nations ruled by Kings, Chieftains, Datus, Lakans, Rajahs and Sultans in Southeast Asia. It was when the Spaniards arrived that they named the collections of areas they conquered and unite in Southeast Asia as "Las Islas Filipinas" or The Islands of the Philippines.

Legendary rulers 
Legendary rulers can be found in the oral tradition in Philippine Mythology, which having an uncertain historical/archeological evidence of their reign.

Archaic rulers 

Wang of Ma-i

Kingdom of Pangasinan (Luyag na Kaboloan)

Historical rulers of Tondo
,

Recorded rulers of Namayan

{| width=100% class="wikitable"
! width=90%, | Legendary rulers of Namayan
|-
| Aside from the records of Huerta, a number of names of rulers are associated with Namayan by folk/oral traditions, as recounted in documents such as the will of Fernando Malang (1589) and documented by academics such as Grace Odal-Devora and writers such as Nick Joaquin.||
|-
|}

The Datus of Madja-as

The Datus of Katugasan

The Datus of Dapitan

Rulers of Maynila

Monarchs of the Butuan Rajahnate

Rajahs of Cebu

Sultans of Maguindanao

The Sultans of Sulu (1405–present)

Philippines Era

The collection of islands conquered by the Spaniards was named Las islas Filipinas; a name given by Ruy López de Villalobos. It's the exact geographical location on which the modern day Republic of the Philippines based its territory.

 Rulers during the Spanish colonization 
During the Spanish colonization, Remaining monarchs reign until their kingdoms was absorbed to the new colonial nation of the Philippines through Spanish conquest. Many of these territories are absorbed much later.

 Rajah Colambu – King of Limasawa in 1521, brother of Rajah Siagu of Butuan. He befriended Portuguese explorer Ferdinand Magellan and guided him to Cebu on April 7, 1521.
 Rajah Humabon – King of Cebu who became an ally of Ferdinand Magellan and the Spaniards. Rival of Datu Lapu-Lapu. In 1521, he and his wife were baptized as Christians and given Christian names Carlos and Juana after the Spanish royalty, King Carlos and Queen Juana.
 Sultan Kudarat – Sultan of Maguindanao.
 Lakan Dula or Lakandula – King of Tondo, one of the last princes of Manila.
 Datu Lapu-Lapu – King of Mactan Island. He defeated the Spaniards on April 27, 1521.
 Datu Sikatuna – King of Bohol in 1565. He made a blood compact with Spanish explorer, Miguel López de Legazpi.
 Datu Pagbuaya – King of Bohol. He governed with his brother Datu Dailisan, a settlement along the shorelines between Mansasa, Tagbilaran and Dauis, which was abandoned years before the Spanish colonization due to Portuguese and Ternatean attacks. He founded Dapitan in the northern shore of Mindanao.
 Datu Dailisan – King of Mansasa, Tagbilaran and Dauis and governed their kingdom along with his brother Datu Pagbuaya. His death during one of the Portuguese raids caused the abandonment of the settlement.
 Datu Manooc – Christian name – Pedro Manuel Manooc, son of Datu Pagbuaya who converted to Christianity, defeated the Higaonon tribe in Iligan, Mindanao. He established one of the first Christian settlements in the country.
 Datu Macabulos – King of Pampanga in 1571.
 Rajah Siagu – King of the Manobo in 1521.
 Apo Noan – Chieftain of Mandani (present day Mandaue) in 1521.
 Apo Macarere – Famous Chieftain of the Tagbanwa warrior tribe in Corong Island (Calis).
 Raja Muda Sulayman – The heir apparent of the Kingdom of Luzon, was defeated by Martín de Goiti, a Spanish soldier commissioned by López de Legazpi to Manila.
 Rajah Tupas – King of Cebu, conquered by Miguel López de Legazpi.
 Datu Urduja – Female Leader in Pangasinan.
 Datu Zula – Chieftain of Mactan, Cebu. Rival of Lapu-lapu
 Datu Kalun – Ruler of the Island of the Basilan and the Yakans in Mindanao, converted his line to Christianity
 Datu Sanday – Ruler of Marawi City
 Datu Saiden Borero – King of Antique
 unnamed Datu – King of Taytay Palawan. Mentioned by Pigafetta, chronicler of Magellan. The king, together with his wife were kidnapped by the remnant troops from Magellan's fleet after fleeing Cebu to secure provisions for their crossing to the Moluccas.
 Datu Cabaylo (Cabailo) – The last king of the Kingdom of Taytay

 Captaincy-General of the Philippines (1565–1761) 

From 1565 to 1898, the Philippines was under Spanish rule. From 1565 to 1821, The governor and captain-general was appointed by the Viceroy of New Spain upon recommendation of the Spanish Cortes and governed on behalf of the Monarch of Spain. When there was a vacancy (e.g. death, or during the transitional period between governors), the Real Audiencia in Manila appoints a temporary governor from among its members.

 During Revolts against Spain (1660–1661) 

 British Occupation of Manila (1762–1764) 

Great Britain occupied Manila and the naval port of Cavite as part of the Seven Years' War.

 Independent Ilocos (1762–1763) 

 Under New Spain (1764–1821) 

 Emperor 

 Spanish East Indies (1821–1898) 

After the 1821 Mexican War of Independence, Mexico became independent and was no longer part of the Spanish Empire. The Viceroyalty of New Spain ceased to exist. The Philippines, as a result, was directly governed from Madrid, under the Crown.

 Revolutionary Republics and States 
The Ruling Leaders during Philippine Revolution

United States Military Government (1898–1901)

The American military government was established following the defeat of Spain in the Spanish–American War. During the transition period, executive authority in all civil affairs in the Philippine government was exercised by the military governor.

 Insular Government (1901–1935) 

On July 4, 1901, executive authority over the islands was transferred to the president of the Second Philippine Commission who had the title of Civil Governor, a position appointed by the President of the United States and approved by the United States Senate. For the first year, a Military Governor, Adna Chaffee, ruled parts of the country still resisting the American rule, concurrent with civil governor, William Howard Taft. Disagreements between the two were not uncommon. The following year, on July 4, 1902, Taft became the sole executive authority. Chaffee remained as commander of Philippine Division until September 30, 1902.

The title was changed to Governor General in 1905 by an act of Congress (Public 43 – February 6, 1905). The term "insular" (from insulam, the Latin word for island'') refers to U.S. island territories that are not incorporated into either a state or a federal district. All insular areas was under the authority of the U.S. Bureau of Insular Affairs, a division of the US War Department.

Philippine Commonwealth (1935–1946) 

On November 15, 1935, the Commonwealth of the Philippines was inaugurated as a transitional government to prepare the country for independence. The office of President of the Philippine Commonwealth replaced the Governor-General as the country's chief executive. The Governor-General became the High Commissioner of the Philippines with Frank Murphy, the last governor-general, as the first high commissioner.  The High Commissioner exercised no executive power but rather represented the colonial power, the United States Government, in the Philippines. The high commissioner moved from Malacañang Palace to the newly built High Commissioner's Residence, now the Embassy of the United States in Manila.

After the Philippine independence on July 4, 1946, the last High Commissioner, Paul McNutt, became the first United States Ambassador to the Philippines.

Japanese Military Governors (1942–1945) 

In December 1941, the Commonwealth of the Philippines was invaded by Japan as part of World War II. The next year, the Empire of Japan sent a military governor to control the country during wartime, followed by the formal establishment of the puppet second republic.

Second Philippine Republic (1943–1945) 

The Second Republic was inaugurated on October 14, 1943, in Manila, and ended when President Jose P. Laurel dissolved the republic on August 17, 1945, in Tokyo.

Third Philippine Republic (1946–1972) 

The Third Republic started when independence was granted by the Americans on July 4, 1946, and ended upon the imposition of martial law by President Ferdinand Marcos on September 21, 1972.

Martial law, New Society, and the Fourth Philippine Republic (1972–1987) 

President Ferdinand Marcos ruled by decree when he declared martial law on September 21, 1972. He inaugurated the "New Society" after a new constitution was ratified on January 17, 1973. He declared the Fourth Republic on January 17, 1981, after martial law was lifted.

Provisional Government and Fifth Philippine Republic (1987–Present) 

President Corazon Aquino, after ascending into office, issued Proclamation No. 3, the Freedom Constitution, ending the Fourth Republic and ushering in the Provisional Government. This called for the adoption of certain provisions of the 1973 constitution, but called for a constitutional commission that shall write a new one. She inaugurated the Fifth Republic after the present constitution was ratified. The plebiscite took place on February 2, 1987.

See also
 President of the Philippines
Governor-General of the Philippines
Filipino styles and honorifics
Heads of state and government of the Philippines
 First Lady or First Gentleman of the Philippines
List of ancient Philippine consorts
 List of presidents of the Philippines
 List of unofficial presidents of the Philippines
 Vice President of the Philippines
 List of vice presidents of the Philippines
 Prime Minister of the Philippines (now defunct)
 Seal of the President of the Philippines
 List of current heads of state and government

Notes

Subnotes

References

Works cited

External links
 Office of the President of the Philippines
 The Presidential Museum and Library
 Philippine Heads of State Timeline at www.worldstatesmen.org

Filipino royalty
1571 disestablishments
States and territories established in 1500
Former countries in Philippine history
Former monarchies of Asia
History of the Philippines (900–1565)
Philippines
Kingdom of Maynila
States and territories established in the 1500s
1500 establishments in Asia